Clifton City is an unincorporated community in southwestern Cooper County, Missouri, United States. The community is located on Missouri Route 135 and Missouri Route BB. The nearest town is Otterville approximately five miles to the south. It is also 10 miles (16 km) northeast of Sedalia. The Lamine River flows past one half mile east of the town. The Cooper - Pettis county boundary lies three-quarters of a mile west of the location.  The Katy Trail State Park passes the south edge of the community.

History
Clifton City was originally called Cranmer's Mill, and under the latter name was settled in the early 1830s. A post office called Clifton City was established in 1873, and remained in operation until 1959. The present name most likely is after Clifton R. Woods, an early settler.

References

External links
Travel Post on the town

Unincorporated communities in Cooper County, Missouri
Unincorporated communities in Missouri